Muhammad Azizul bin Baharuddin (born 27 February 1998) is a Malaysian footballer who plays as a forward.

Club career

Early year
Born and raised in Selangor, Azizul was in the Selangor FA's youth team at the age of 17, having arrived from local side Bukit Jalil Sports School and Harimau Muda B. Before that, Azizul had represented Selangor MSSM in the MSSM Football Competition at Pasir Gudang, Johor in 2013, when he was 14 years old.

Selangor
Azizul was a key player for Selangor President Cup and Academy. In addition to winning his first President Cup medal with Selangor under-21 on 2017, he also finished the season with 23 appearances and scoring three goals. On 27 November 2017, Selangor under-21 manager, Ariffin Ab Hamid confirmed that Azizul would be definitely promoted to Selangor's first team for 2018 season.

International career

Azizul previously represented Malaysia at U19 and U21 level, but rarely get a place to play with the national team squad.

Career statistics

Club

1 Includes Malaysia FA Cup matches.
2 Includes Malaysia Cup matches.

Honours

Club
Selangor
 President Cup (1): 2017

References

External links
 Profile at faselangor.my

1998 births
Living people
Malaysian footballers
Selangor FA players
Malaysia Super League players
Malaysian people of Malay descent
People from Selangor
Association football wingers
Association football midfielders